tert-Butyl acetate, t-butyl acetate or TBAc is a colorless flammable liquid with a camphor- or blueberry-like smell.  It is used as a solvent in the production of lacquers, enamels, inks, adhesives, thinners and industrial cleaners.  It has recently gained EPA volatile organic compound (VOC) exempt status.

It is manufactured from acetic acid and isobutylene. An attempt at Fischer esterification would lead to elimination of tert-butyl alcohol to isobutylene.

Butyl acetate has four isomers (or five, including stereoisomers): tert-butyl acetate, n-butyl acetate, isobutyl acetate, and sec-butyl acetate (two enantiomers).

See also
 tert-Butyl formate
 PCBTF VOC Exempt

References

External links
 ChemExpr.com
CDC - NIOSH Pocket Guide to Chemical Hazards

Ester solvents
Acetate esters
Tert-butyl compounds
Sweet-smelling chemicals